Osiedle Kawaleryjskie is one of the districts of the Polish city of Białystok. Osiedla Kawaleryjskie was called Nowe Miasto 2 (New City 2) until 2002.

External links 

Districts of Białystok